Ali Guitoune (born 15 February 1986) is an Algerian footballer who plays for AS Khroub in Algerian Ligue Professionnelle 2 as a defender.

References

External links

1986 births
Living people
Association football defenders
Algerian footballers
DRB Tadjenanet players
21st-century Algerian people